Ibrahim Omer (born 1979/1980) is an Eritrean-born New Zealand politician. In 2020 he became a Member of Parliament for the Labour Party.

Early life 
Omer is a refugee from Eritrea. His mother language is Saho and he is a Muslim. He fled his home as a teenager to Sudan, where the United Nations High Commissioner for Refugees became involved and referred his case on to third countries for resettlement. 

While in United Nations-run refugee camps in Sudan, Omer worked as an interpreter. This work led to suspicions of spying, and he was retained by authorities until the United Nations intervened.

Education and organising career 
He arrived in New Zealand in 2008, through New Zealand's refugee quota. Omer says that his time in New Zealand began with cleaning and scrubbing floors; this period included working as a cleaner at Victoria University of Wellington where he would study and earn a Bachelor of Arts in political science in 2016. Omer described working until 4am cleaning the university, then attending a lecture at 10am in a room that he had cleaned the night before.

Omer has worked as a union organiser for E tū, and as a community advocate, including as chairperson of ChangeMakers Resettlement Forum. For this work he was awarded an Absolutely Positively Wellingtonian Award by the Wellington City Council in 2019. Omer was also involved in advocating for a living wage, especially for cleaners at Victoria University of Wellington.

Member of Parliament 

He was placed 42nd on the Labour Party's party list, and Labour won enough seats to allow him to enter Parliament with that ranking.

Omer is New Zealand's first African MP, and the second to have entered New Zealand as a refugee. Following Jacinda Ardern's resignation as Prime Minister in 2023, Omer stated that " Throughout the past five and a half years, she has led with decisiveness, empathy and kindness".

He was successful and will contest the electorate for Labour at the upcoming election.

Political views 
Omer has expressed a desire to focus on racism, unequal opportunities, and issues facing low-paid workers during his time in Parliament.

In December 2020, Omer joined Green Party MPs Golriz Ghahraman and Teanau Tuiono in pledging to form a new parliamentary Palestine friendship group to "raise the voices of Palestinian peoples in the New Zealand Parliament" during an event organised by the Wellington Palestine advocacy group to mark the International Day of Solidarity with the Palestinian people.

References

External links 

 Official website

Living people
New Zealand people of Eritrean descent
New Zealand Muslims
New Zealand Labour Party MPs
New Zealand list MPs
21st-century New Zealand politicians
Eritrean politicians
Members of the New Zealand House of Representatives
Candidates in the 2020 New Zealand general election
Year of birth missing (living people)